The 2014–15 Cornell Big Red men's basketball team represented Cornell University during the 2014–15 NCAA Division I men's basketball season. The Big Red, led by fifth year head coach Bill Courtney, played their home games at Newman Arena and were members of the Ivy League. They finished the season 13–17, 5–9 in Ivy League play to finish in a tie for fifth place.

Roster

Schedule

|-
!colspan=9 style="background:#B31B1B; color:#FFFFFF;"| Regular season

References

Cornell Big Red men's basketball seasons
Cornell
Cornell Big Red men's basketball
Cornell Big Red men's basketball